Bernard Smith (September 20, 1907 – December 21, 1999) was an American literary editor, film producer, and literary critic.  He is best remembered for his work at the Knopf publishing house, where he edited B. Traven, Raymond Chandler, and Dashiell Hammett, and Langston Hughes.

Early life
Bernard Smith was born on September 20, 1907, in New York City. His father was a businessman and his mother was a housewife. He attended City University of New York.

Career
In 1928, Smith began working for Alfred A. Knopf, where he was eventually made simultaneously editor-in-chief and managing editor. He became Traven's first American editor, and took a free hand in revising Traven's initially rough English.

In 1939, Smith published his Forces in American Criticism, a historical and critical survey of American literature and literary criticism from a Marxist perspective. Smith, though never a Communist Party member, was a committed Marxist; but the book was undogmatic and was well received in the mainstream literary academy, including favorable notice from critics such as Austin Warren.  He collaborated with Malcolm Cowley while working for the New Republic in his early 20s.

Smith moved in 1947 to Hollywood, where he worked in the film industry, first for Samuel Goldwyn as a script editor. In 1950, he became an independent producer, producing such Hollywood films such as Elmer Gantry and How the West was Won. In 1963 he partnered as a producer with director John Ford, making films such as Cheyenne Autumn.

In 1994 Smith published a memoir, A World Remembered: 1925-1950, which has been used academically as an autobiography supporting historical texts. He edited volumes including The Democratic Spirit: A Collection of American Writings From the Earliest Times to the Present Day (1941, second edition 1943), Books That Changed Our Minds, and The Holiday Reader with Philip Van Doren Stern. His work also included studies published in the 1940s of the painters Moses Soyer and David Burliuk.

Personal life
Smith's brother, Emil Smith  was a biologist and UCLA professor emeritus credited with having his work with plasma.   Emil is survived by his two sons, Geoffrey Smith, a Harvard graduate and current doctor at UCLA  and J. Donald Smith (Columbia, University of Chicago, Dartmouth, New England Gilbert and Sullivan Society)

Death
Smith died on December 21, 1999, at the Beverly Hills Rehabilitation Center in Beverly Hills, California.

Filmography
Immortal Gentleman (1935, producer).
Men Without Honour (1939, producer).
Elmer Gantry (1960, producer).
How the West Was Won (1962, producer).
Cheyenne Autumn (1964, producer).
7 Women (1966, producer).
Alfred the Great (1969, producer).

References

1907 births
1999 deaths
Writers from New York City
People from Beverly Hills, California
City University of New York alumni
American literary editors
Film producers from California
Film producers from New York (state)